Ženski košarkaški klub Livno commonly abbreviated as ŽKK Livno or simply Livno is a women's basketball club from Livno, Bosnia and Herzegovina.

History
The club was founded in 1984 as ŽKK Troglav.

Honours

Domestic

National competitions – 0
Basketball Championship of Bosnia and Herzegovina:
Runners-up (2) : 1999, 2003

Competitions of Herzeg-Bosnia (2nd-tier) – 4
League of Herzeg-Bosnia
Winners(1): 2000
Cup of Herzeg-Bosnia
Winners(4): 1998, 1999, 2000, 2003

References

External links
 
Profile at eurobasket.com
Profile at facebook.com

Women's basketball teams in Bosnia and Herzegovina
Basketball teams established in 1984
Croatian sports clubs outside Croatia

Sport in Livno